Muttil is a village in Wayanad district in the state of Kerala, India.

Demographics
 Total Population: 30,762
  India census, Muttil South had a population of 19467 with 9652 males and 9815 females.
  India census, Muttil North had a population of 11,295 with 5,650 males and 5,645 females.
19 wards are in panchayath. main is 3,19 ward pariyaram and chilanjichal
muttil is near kalpetta and develop very fast with kalpetta

Transportation
Muttil is 76 km away from Kozhikode city and the road NH 766 connects Kozhikode and Kollagal includes nine hairpin bends. The nearest major airport is at Calicut. The road to the east connects to Mysore and Bangalore. Night journey is not allowed on this sector as it goes through Bandipur national forest. The nearest railway station is at Kozhikode.

References

Villages in Wayanad district
Kalpetta area